Margaret S. Lewis is a former member of the Wisconsin State Assembly.

Biography
Lewis was born on June 19, 1954. She graduated from Homestead High School in Mequon, Wisconsin and the University of Wisconsin–Madison and is married with two children.

Career
Lewis was first elected to the Assembly in 1984. She is a Republican.

References

People from Outagamie County, Wisconsin
Republican Party members of the Wisconsin State Assembly
Women state legislators in Wisconsin
University of Wisconsin–Madison alumni
1954 births
Living people
21st-century American women